Bird Township may refer to the following townships in the United States:

 Bird Township, Conway County, Arkansas, Conway County, Arkansas
 Bird Township, Jackson County, Arkansas, Jackson County, Arkansas
 Bird Township, Macoupin County, Illinois

Township name disambiguation pages